Macrococcus is a genus of Gram-positive cocci belonging to the family Staphylococcaceae. The genus was created in 1998.

History
The first recognised species in this genus (Macrococcus caseolyticus) was initially named Micrococcus caseolyticus by Evans in 1916. It was then renamed Staphylococcus caseolyticus by Schleifer et al in 1982. It received its current designation in 1998 by Kloos et al.

Description
Members of the genus Macrococcus are Gram-positive, nonmotile, non-spore-forming cocci that are coagulase negative and catalase positive. They can be distinguished phenotypically from most staphylococci on the basis of their cellular morphology (they are 2.5 – 4.0 times larger in diameter compared to Staphylococcus aureus) and their positive cytochrome c oxidase reaction. Species in this genus are resistant to bacitracin and lysozyme and sensitive to furazolidone. The DNA base content is 38–45 mol% G+C. The cell walls lack teichoic acid. They are usually unencapsulated.

The type species is Macrococcus equipercicus.

Genome
The first genome of this genus was sequenced in 2009

Evolution
This genus is the closest known relation of the genus Staphylococcus. Within Staphylococcus, the closest relations of Macrococcus appear to be the Staphylococcus sciuri group.

Clinical
This genus is not known to cause human disease.

A methicillin resistance gene has been identified in this genus. The significance of this discovery is not yet clear.

Etymology

The name Macrococcus is a masculine New Latin noun composed of the Greek adjective makros (μάκρος) meaning "large" and the Neolatin masculine noun coccus intended to mean a coccus shaped bacterium, as it comes from the Greek masculine noun kokkos (κόκκος) meaning "berry", consequently the noun Macrococcus, means "large coccus".

The eymology of the epithet of the 8 species contained in the genus are:
 For M. bovicus ( Kloos et al. 1998), the epithet is the masculine form of  bovicus, -a, -um, a Neolatin adjective derived from the Latin noun bos, bovis meaning "cow", given that the type strain was isolated from a cow.
 For M. brunensis ( Mannerová et al. 2003), the Latin masculine adjective brunensis meaning from Bruna, the Roman name of the city of Brünn in the Czech Republic, where the type strain was isolated.
 M. canis (Gobeli Brawand et al. 2017)
 For M. carouselicus ( Kloos et al. 1998), the Neolatin adjective carouselicus meaning "pertaining " to a carousel".
 For M. caseolyticus ((Schleifer et al. 1982) Kloos et al. 1998), the epithet is a Neolatin adjective which is a combination of the Latin noun caseus meaning "cheese" and the Neolatin adjective lyticus (from the Greek adjective lutikos (λυτικός)) meaning "able to dissolve", to mean "casein-dissolving".
 For M. equipercicus ( Kloos et al. 1998), the epithet is a Neolatin adjective, meaning "pertaining to Percy, the horse", composed of the Latin noun equus, -i meaning "horse" and the Neolatinised English proper name "Percy" to Percus, -i, which is the name of the Irish thoroughbred horse from which the species was isolated (In Kloos et al. 1998 the component equus is said to be in the genitive case, but more correctly equi" is the root equ-" plus a joining "-i-" as first word is a Latin word,"c.f."). 
 M. hajekii ( Mannerová et al. 2003) New Latin genitive case noun hajekii, of Hájek, named after Wenceslaus Hajek, a Czech microbiologist.
 M. lamae ( Mannerová; et al. 2003) New Latin feminine gender genitive case noun lamae'', of Lama, the zoological genus name of the llama.

References

External links
 Summary of the genome data 

Staphylococcaceae
Bacteria genera